Subrata Roy (born 10 June 1948) is an Indian businessman who founded Sahara India Pariwar in 1978.

Sahara India Pariwar has operated a vast number of businesses such as Aamby Valley City, Sahara Movie Studios, Air Sahara, hockey sports, Filmy, among others.

Roy was named among the 10 Most Powerful People of India in 2012 by India Today. In 2004, Sahara group was termed by Time magazine as 'the second largest employer in India after Indian Railways. The group operates through more than 5,000 establishments spread across India and has a workforce of around 1.2 million (both field and office) under the Sahara India umbrella.

Early life
Subrata Roy was born in Bengali Hindu family in Araria on 10 June 1948 to Sudhir Chandra Roy and Chhabi Roy.His father and mother came from Dhaka Bikrampur East Bengal presidency now Bangladesh from a rich landlord family named " "Vaggokul Jamider". He studied at Holy Child Institute in Kolkata and later studied mechanical engineering from Government Technical Institute, Gorakhpur. Roy started his first business in Gorakhpur.

Business career

Roy joined Sahara Finance, a struggling company, in 1976, that ran a chit fund and took it over. He changed its financial model in 1978. Sahara is said to have used the financial model of much older Peerless Group. They are termed residuary non-banking companies (RNBCs) that accept deposits of very low amounts.

In the 1990s, Roy moved to Lucknow which became the base of his group. From there, it went on to become the largest conglomerate of India with a diversified range of business interests. The company now has interests in financial services, education, real estate, media, entertainment, tourism, healthcare, and hospitality.

The Hindi newspaper Rashtriya Sahara was started in 1992. In the late 1990s, the ambitious Aamby Valley City project near Pune was initiated. In 2000, Sahara TV was launched which was later renamed Sahara One.
In 2003, Sahara started three weeklies: Sahara Time (English), Sahara Samay (Hindi) and Sahara Aalmi (Urdu).
 
In 2010, Sahara purchased the iconic Grosvenor House Hotel in London, and 2012 the historic Plaza Hotel and Dream Downtown Hotel in New York City.

Sahara has a workforce of around 1.2 million including Salaried Employees, Consultants, Field Workers, Agents & Business Associates, etc. In 2004, Sahara group was termed by Time magazine as "the second-largest employer in India" after the Government-run Indian Railways.

Sahara is said to have 9 crore plus investors and depositors, representing about 13% of all households in India.

Roy has been planning to foray into online education (edunguru) in India, which is targeted at small towns and villages. He has put a team in place which consists of members from top universities and colleges across India, and even abroad. The route map of the program has been prepared, and 14,000 hours of lectures have been developed for this.

In June 2019 Roy announced his foray into the automobile sector under the brand name 'Sahara Evols'. The Sahara Evols venture will offer a wide range of electric vehicles (EVs) along with advanced allied services.

Humanitarian efforts
In 2013, Sahara contributed to the relief efforts in flood hit Uttarakhand region wherein one lakh bottles of drinking water, packaged juice and food packets along with candles and match boxes were said to be provided by them. There were 25 medical health unit vans equipped with doctors and free medicines made available and it was said by the group that, they will contribute to the rehabilitation programme by constructing 10,000 pre-fabricated houses.

Post Kargil War, the then Prime Minister of India Atal Bihari Vajpayee praised Sahara India led by Subrata Roy Sahara for providing financial support to the 127 families of martyrs.

Subrata Roy owned Hotel Sahara Star Mumbai has joined hands with Feeding India to give back to the society. As a part of its CSR initiatives, the hotel will be providing food to the ones in need.

Awards and honors

Roy received an honorary doctorate in business leadership from the University of East London (2013).

He also received the Business Icon of the Year award at the Powerbrands Hall of Fame Awards in London in 2011.

He has been the ITA – TV Icon of the Year 2007. He has received the Global Leadership Award in 2004.

Subrata Roy received Businessmen of the Year Award in 2002, the Best Industrialist Award in 2002, Vishisht Rashtriya Udaan Samman (2010) by a daily from one of India's top publication houses, Vocational Award for Excellence (2010) by Rotary International, Karmaveer Samman (1995), Udyam Shree (1994), Baba-E-Rozgar Award (1992) and the National Citizen Award in 2001.

He was awarded a general jury award by the Indian Television Academy Awards.

He has been also awarded honorary degree of D. Litt. by Lalit Narayan Mithila University, Darbhanga.

Moreover, he has been featured regularly in the India Today list of 50 Most Powerful People of India, since 2003.

In 2004, Sahara India was termed by Time magazine as "the second largest employer in India" after Indian Railways.

In 2012, Roy was named among the 10 most influential businessmen in India by the news magazine India Today.

Legal issues

On 26 February 2014, the Supreme Court of India ordered the detention of Roy for failing to appear before it in connection with legal dispute with Market Regulator - SEBI. In a statement after the arrest, his lawyer said Roy's 92-year-old mother was in poor health and needed "her eldest son" by her side, and hence he failed to appear at the court.  As he failed to appear in the court during the ongoing legal battle, Roy was held in custody in the Tihar Jail, Delhi and is now out on parole since May 2016. Sahara was allowed to sell a part of its assets in India to raise part of the money in question.

Roy has rejected allegations of misconduct and has alleged Indian National Congress of witch hunt due to his opposition to Sonia Gandhi over becoming the country's prime minister.

Initially he was granted interim bail by Supreme Court of India on 26 March 2014 on condition of depositing ₹10,000 crore to the market regulator SEBI.  His deposit of ₹10,000 crore has not been made.  As of August 2014, Roy was trying to sell some of his hotel properties to raise enough money. Roy was granted his first bail in May 2017 for four weeks to perform the last rites for his deceased mother, later extended to 24 October. Since then he has been successful in getting his bail extended on various grounds.  As of 31 January 2019, Sahara still had to pay ₹10,621 crore to meet its total liability.

Roy claims that the company's fundamentals are intact and assets are greater (3 to 5 times) than the liabilities. Sahara also has deposited ₹22,500 crores which will in due course of justice come back to Sahara India as it has already repaid 95% of its investors.

The Securities And Exchange Board of India (SEBI) has repaid only  ₹64 crore to the investors since 2012. It is also been reported that Sahara has paid ₹725.97 crore as TDS (tax deducted at source) to the Income Tax Departments on the interest which along with investment was repaid to 95 percent of the investors, between 2009–2010 and 2012–2013. The income tax authorities had found that the beneficiary investors were existent and accordingly confirmed the repayments made in those particular years. One of Sahara's arguments in the apex court revolves around the fact that if one government body has found investors, why the other cannot do so.

On 28 August 2020, two petitions were filed against the release of the Netflix documentary Bad Boy Billionaires: India in the Bihar district court. The Bihar court passed an interim stay order on the petition filed by Subrata Roy against the release of the documentary on the Netflix platform. Following the stay order by the Bihar court, Netflix threatened to move the Supreme Court against the court order for restraining the documentary release.

On 5 October 2020, Netflix released three out of four films in the anthology, including those featuring Vijay Mallya ("The King of Good Times"), Nirav Modi ("Diamonds Aren't Forever") and Subrata Roy ("The World's Biggest Family"), while the final episode about Ramalinga Raju remained encumbered by legal injunctions and as of December 2020 has yet to be released.

See also

 Sahara India Pariwar

References

External links
 Official Website of 'Saharasri' Subrata Roy Sahara 
 Subrata Roy Sahara Website
 Sahara Group Official Website

Bengali people
1947 births
Living people
People from Araria
Businesspeople from Bihar
Indian Premier League franchise owners
Businesspeople from Lucknow
Sahara India Pariwar
20th-century Indian businesspeople
Force India
Inmates of Tihar Jail
People charged with fraud